"Little Things Mean a Lot" is a popular song, with lyrics by Edith Lindeman and music by Carl Stutz, published in 1953. Lindeman was the leisure editor of the Richmond Times-Dispatch, and Stutz, a disc jockey from Richmond, Virginia. Stutz and Lindeman are also known for writing Perry Como's 1959 hit, "I Know" (which reached No.47 on the U.S. Billboard chart and No.13 on the UK Singles Chart).

The best known recording of "Little Things Mean a Lot," by Kitty Kallen (Decca 9-29037), reached No.1 on the Billboard chart in 1954, and also reached No.1 on the Cash Box chart the same year. Billboard ranked it as the No. 1 song of 1954. In addition, the track climbed to the top spot in the UK Singles Chart in September of that same year.

Other charting versions
Alma Cogan with orchestra conducted by Frank Cordell recorded it in London on May 22, 1954. Cogan's recording was released by EMI and reached No. 11 in the UK.
Joni James reached No.35 in 1960.
Margo Smith, whose version reached No.3 C&W and also charted at No.37 on the Adult Contemporary chart in 1978. In 1985 a remake of the song by 
Dana reached No.27 in Ireland in 1985.

References

1953 songs
1954 singles
Number-one singles in the United States
UK Singles Chart number-one singles
Margo Smith songs
1950s ballads